Kuch Reh Jeewiyal Pall is a popular Indian drama-series aired on DD National, which was later dubbed in Sindhi. It set records of popularity and TRPs (Television Rating Points) in Pakistan, which were broken by Kyunki Saas Bhi Kabhi Bahu Thi, Kahaani Ghar Ghar Kii,  Kasautii Zindagii Kay, Kahiin To Hoga, Kaun Banega Crorepati. (The five shows which broke all previous TRP, popularity, and fan-following records of all the shows in Asia). The story revolves around a rivalry between two sisters.

This show started with telecast of three episodes a week, but due to a high public demand the telecast was increased from 3 to 5 episodes a week.

It airs from Wednesday to Sunday, 9:20pm Pakistan time on Kawish Television Network (KTN TV). It also has repeats during the week.

Plot
The story is of two sisters, their love and sacrifices for each other. Circumstances put them opposite each other as mother–in-law and daughter–in–law and they have to find their own path towards their values and ethics.

A family that united by its belief and faith in its bonds never dreamt that it would just take a split second for this delicate bond to break. This story is a showcase of fragile relationships.

Trivia
It recently completed 100 episodes which is a landmark for Sindhi Television industry.
This show started with telecast of 3 episodes a week, but due to its popularity the telecast was increased from 3 to 5 episodes a week.
This show is distributed in Pakistan by Platform Productions.
This show went off air in May 2007. Its repeat is scheduled to start soon.

Cast
 Kanwaljit Singh
 Usha Bachani 
 Avinash Wadhawan
 Neha Bam
 Madhavi Singh
 Vishal Watwani
 Kajal Shah
 Kunika

References

DD National original programming
Indian drama television series
Sindhi-language mass media